Yukarıbilenler is a village in the İslahiye District, Gaziantep Province, Turkey. The village is inhabited by Kurds of the Delikan tribe and had a population of 690 in 2022.

References

Villages in İslahiye District
Kurdish settlements in Gaziantep Province